Ofri Arad (born 11 September 1998) is an Israeli footballer who plays as a centre-back for FC Kairat and the Israel national team.

Early life
Arad was born in kibbutz HaHotrim, Israel, to a Jewish family. He is the youngest brother of former footballer Dori Arad.

Club career

Arad made his official debut for Maccabi Haifa on 4 August 2018 in a game against Hapoel Ironi Kiryat Shmona in the Toto Cup and also score the winning goal.

He made his Israeli Premier League debut for Maccabi Haifa on 4 December 2018 in a game against Bnei Sakhnin.

He scored is first league goal on 4 December 2019 in a game against F.C. Ashdod.

On May 30, 2021, he won his first adult title, as winning the Israeli Permier league championship, after making 32 league appearances and scoring 1 league goal.

On 19 February 2023 loaned to the Kazakhstan Premier League club FC Kairat for one season.

International career 
Arad made his senior debut for Israel against Slovakia on 14 October 2020, coming in as a sub after half time and contributing to a surprise 3:2 win.

Honours
Maccabi Haifa
 Israeli Premier League: 2020–21, 2021–22
 Toto Cup: 2021–22
 Israel Super Cup: 2021

References

External links

1998 births
Living people
Israeli footballers
Maccabi Haifa F.C. players
Hapoel Ramat Gan F.C. players
FC Kairat players
Israeli Premier League players
Liga Leumit players
Kazakhstan Premier League players
People from HaHotrim
Israeli expatriate footballers
Expatriate footballers in Kazakhstan
Israeli expatriate sportspeople in Kazakhstan
Israel youth international footballers
Israel under-21 international footballers
Israel international footballers
Association football defenders